Bashkimi  is a newspaper published in Albania. Its name is derived from the Albanian word for "unity".

History and profile
Bashkimi was established in 1943. Its headquarters is in Tirana. It used to be the organ of the Democratic Front.

As of 1995 it was published biweekly and had 5,000 readers.

References

Defunct newspapers published in Albania
Newspapers established in 1943
Mass media in Tirana
1943 establishments in Albania
Biweekly newspapers